Osama Nabieh (born 20 January 1975) is a former Egyptian professional footballer who currently coaches for the Egyptian National Team. Nabih has played for several clubs in Egypt, including Zamalek, Tersana and Baladeyet Al-Mahalla, and also spent time with Altay S.K. in Turkey and Al Kuwait. Nabih played for the Egypt national football team at the 1998 African Cup of Nations.

Honors
For Egypt
African Cup of Nations 1998
All Africa Games Gold Medal 1995
For Zamalek
2 Egyptian League Titles
1 Egyptian Cup title
1 Egyptian Super Cup (2001/2002) (Scored the cup winner in extra time)
1 African Cup of Champions Clubs title
1 African Cup Winners' Cup title
2 African Super cup titles
1 Afro-Asian Cup title

References

External links
 
 Profile at FilGoal 
 

1975 births
Living people
Sportspeople from Giza
Zamalek SC players
Egyptian footballers
Egypt international footballers
1998 African Cup of Nations players
Altay S.K. footballers
Expatriate footballers in Turkey
Expatriate footballers in Kuwait
Egyptian expatriate sportspeople in Kuwait
Egyptian Premier League players
Association football forwards
Tersana SC players
Kuwait SC players
Egyptian expatriate sportspeople in Turkey
21st-century Egyptian people